De Mysteriis may refer to:

De Mysteriis Aegyptiorum by Iamblichus
De Mysteriis Dom Sathanas, studio album by the Norwegian black metal band Mayhem
De Vermis Mysteriis (album), studio album by American heavy metal band High on Fire
De Vermis Mysteriis, fictional grimoire